is a private Roman Catholic girls' junior and senior high school in Izumi-ku, Sendai, Miyagi Prefecture, Japan.

Sendai Private School for Girls was established in central Sendai 1893 by the Sisters of St. Paul de Chartres. In 1948 the school received its current name, and in 1998 it moved to its present location.  it had 1,080 students.

References

External links
 Sendai Shirayuri Gakuen Junior High School and High School 
 High school English page
 Junior high school English page

Private schools in Japan
High schools in Miyagi Prefecture
Girls' schools in Japan
1893 establishments in Japan
Educational institutions established in 1893
Buildings and structures in Sendai